The Detroit College of Business was a four-year business college that was founded in 1962 and located in Dearborn, Michigan.

In 2000, it was part of a merger with Davenport College and Great Lakes College that became Davenport University.

References

Defunct private universities and colleges in Michigan
Educational institutions established in 1962
Educational institutions disestablished in 2000
1962 establishments in Michigan